Pacificus was a disciple of St. Francis of Assisi, born probably near Ascoli, Italy, in the second half of the twelfth century; died, it is thought, at Lens, France, around 1234.

Poet Laureate
Local authors identify him with a certain William of Lisciano, who joined the court of Henry VI, Holy Roman Emperor. Before becoming Friar Minor (Franciscan) he had been poet laureate at the Court of Frederick II, Holy Roman Emperor.

Around 1212  St. Francis preached at San Severino, in the Marches; the poet had a vision of two resplendent swords crossed on the saint's breast. He was deeply impressed by this vision.

In a preface to a book by Cardinal Cantalamessa about St. Francis, Pope Francis wrote, "When Brother Pacificus, then known as William of Lisciano, met St. Francis, 'he saw the splendor of his holiness and through him saw the beauty of God's face. That which he always sought, he finally found and found thanks to a holy man.'"

William asked to be received into the new order.  St. Francis gladly complied, giving him the name of Pacificus. In the Speculum perfectionis, attributed to Brother Leo, Pacificus is said to have experienced a vision at San Pietro in Bovara of Francis in heaven.

Introduced Friars Minor into France
Francis summoned Brother Pacificus and sent him, with other friars, throughout the world, preaching the praises of God. In 1217 he was sent to France, where he is said to have become the founder, and first provincial, of the Friars Minor.

In the Spring of 1226 Pacificus witnessed the holy "Stigmata of St. Francis". The last certain date we have in the life of Brother Pacificus is that of the papal bull, 12 August 1227, in which Pope Gregory IX recommends the Poor Clares of Siena to Pacificus' care. Cf "Magna sicut dicitur", 1227 (Bullarium Franciscanum volume I, 33–34)

Return to France
Pacificus was sent back to France, where he later died.

It has long been mooted that Pacificus' poetic abilities were put to use turning Saint Francis' songs into verse, however there is no evidence to support this.

References

Italian Franciscans
1230s births